Acanthopale is a genus of polychaetes belonging to the family Chrysopetalidae.

The species of this genus are found in Central America.

Species:

Acanthopale perkinsi

References

Polychaetes